John Hugh Proudfoot (18 May 1912 – 30 November 1980) was a Liberal party member of the House of Commons of Canada. He was a breeder and lumberman by career.

The son of A.G. Proudfoot and Esther M. Creighton,
 Hugh Proudfoot was born in Fort-Coulonge, Quebec where he served as mayor from 1945 to 1950. In 1937, he married Iva Winifred Langford. In the 1949 federal election, he won a Parliamentary seat at the Pontiac—Témiscamingue riding. Proudfoot was re-elected for successive terms in 1953 and 1957, then in 1958 was defeated by Paul Martineau of the Progressive Conservative party.

Proudfoot died in 1980, aged 68.

References

External links
 

1912 births
1980 deaths
Members of the House of Commons of Canada from Quebec
Anglophone Quebec people
Liberal Party of Canada MPs
People from Outaouais
Mayors of places in Quebec